Breueh Island (also Pulo Breuh, Pulau Breuh, Poelau Bras, Poeloe Bras) is an island in Pulo Aceh district, Aceh Besar Regency, Aceh, Indonesia off the northwest tip of the island of Sumatra. It is about 18 mi west-northwest of Banda Aceh.

The capital of Pulo Aceh, Lampuyang, is located on Breueh.

Nearby are the islands of Nasi, Deudap, Geupon, Batee, and Weh.

The International Hydrographic Organization defines the northern tip of Breueh (under the name Poeloe Bras) as the southeasternmost point of the Bay of Bengal and as part of the southwestern limit of the Andaman Sea. To the southwest of Breueh is the open Indian Ocean. The Nicobar Islands' southernmost point is about 108 mi northwest of Breueh.

Islands of Aceh